The Jireček Line is a conceptual boundary through the ancient Balkans that divides the influence of the Latin (in the north) and Greek (in the south) languages in the Roman Empire from antiquity until the 4th century. The border has been repeatedly corrected by the discovery of new inscriptions. A possible rough outline of it goes from near Lissus (near Lezhë and Laç in modern Albania) to Serdica (now Sofia, in Bulgaria) and then follows the Balkan Mountains to Odessus (Varna) on the Black Sea or continuing along the coastline northwards to the Danube Delta.

History
This line is important in establishing the area where the Romanian, Aromanian, Megleno-Romanian and Albanian people formed (see Origin of the Romanians and Origin of the Albanians). It was originally used by Czech historian Konstantin Jireček in 1911 in a history of the Slavic people.

The placement of the line is based on archaeological findings. Most of the inscriptions found to the north of it are written in Latin, and most of the inscriptions found to the south of it are in Greek.

Purpose
The proposed line, in its various forms, is a theoretical tool. Already in antiquity there were significant exceptions: there were Hellenized groups north of the line (e.g. the Greek colonies along the western coastline of the Black Sea) and Latinized groups may have lived south of the line. Even so, it is a useful — although approximate — instrument for determining which influence a certain area was predominantly exposed to.

More recent scholars have revised it somewhat: Kaimio (1979) places Dalmatia and Moesia Superior in the Latin area and Moesia Inferior in the Greek sphere. MacLeod (1982) suggests that there may not have been "an official language policy for each and every aspect of life", but that "individual Roman officials [made] common sense ad hoc decisions". He also points out that while the area was under pre-Byzantine Roman rule, "even in Greek areas... Latin was the dominant language in inscriptions recording public works, on milestones, and in the army".

See also
 Greek East and Latin West
 Daco-Roman
 Thraco-Roman
 History of Romanian
 Romanian language
 Albanian–Romanian linguistic relationship

References

 Jireček, Konstantin, Geschichte der Serben ' The history of the Serbs ', Gotha, 1911.
 Kaimio, Jorma, The Romans and the Greek Language, Commentationes Humanarum Litterarum 64. Helsinki: Societas Scientiarum Fennica, 1979. (not seen)
 MacLeod, M.D., review of Kaimio, 1979 in The Classical Review, New Ser., 32:2:216-218, 1982. JSTOR

Cultural boundaries
Romanization of Southeastern Europe
Moesia
Ancient history of the Balkans
Isoglosses
1911 introductions
1911 in Austria-Hungary
Latin language in ancient Rome
Koine Greek